Tibezonium iodide (or tibenzonium iodide) is an antiseptic for use in the mouth. It is a salt consisting of a lipophilic quaternary ammonium cation and iodide as the counterion.

References 

Benzodiazepines
Iodides
Quaternary ammonium compounds
Thioethers